The 1977–78 Football League season was Birmingham City Football Club's 75th in the Football League and their 44th in the First Division. They finished in 11th position in the 22-team division. They entered the 1977–78 FA Cup at the third round proper and lost to Derby County in the fourth, and lost to Notts County in their opening second-round match in the League Cup. They entered the Anglo-Scottish Cup but failed to progress past the group stage.

Twenty-two players made at least one appearance in nationally organised first-team competition, and there were ten different goalscorers. Forward pairing Keith Bertschin and Trevor Francis played in all 48 first-team matches of the season – midfielder Terry Hibbitt missed only one – and Francis was the club's top scorer with 29 goals, of which 25 were scored in the league. Both Francis and Hibbitt had been ever-present in the previous season.

After defeats in the first four league matches of the season, Willie Bell was sacked in September and succeeded by former England national manager Sir Alf Ramsey, a member of the club's board of directors. Ramsey lasted only six months, leaving the club ostensibly for health reasons, but his biography suggests he was "locked in an increasingly bitter three-way dispute with his star player, Trevor Francis, and the board". After initially accepting a transfer request from Francis, the board changed their minds, reluctant to "incur the wrath of already disgruntled fans", so Ramsey handed in his notice. The Times reported that "Sir Alf said he told the board [in February] that he intended to quit and sever his links with the club. ... He said at a board meeting on February 20 he recommended both Francis and the defender, Joe Gallagher, should be transfer listed. The board agreed but three days later changed their minds about Francis. Sir Alf said he then decided to opt out because of the board's policy." Blackburn Rovers manager Jim Smith took over, having decided, according to the Rovers' website, that "Birmingham City offered better career prospects".

Football League First Division

League table (part)

FA Cup

League Cup

Anglo-Scottish Cup

Appearances and goals

Numbers in parentheses denote appearances as substitute.
Players with name struck through and marked  left the club during the playing season.
Players with names in italics and marked * were on loan from another club for the whole of their season with Birmingham.

See also
Birmingham City F.C. seasons

References
General
 
 
 Source for match dates and results: 
 Source for lineups, appearances, goalscorers and attendances: Matthews (2010), Complete Record, pp. 390–91, 478.

Specific

Birmingham City F.C. seasons
Birmingham City